Tamarix nilotica, the Nile tamarisk is a species of shrub or small tree in the tamarisk family. It is found in arid parts of North Africa and the Middle East, particularly areas with high salinity. It forms part of the dune stabilisation process.

Description

Distribution and habitat
Tamarix nilotica is found in Lebanon, Palestine, Egypt, Sudan, Somalia, Ethiopia and Kenya. In the Nile Valley in Egypt, this tree grows beside the river and the irrigation channels. It can form dense thickets in suitable locations. It is also found as part of a salt-tolerant community in saline depressions in the Western Desert, and on coastal dunes where its deep roots are able to extract saline water from the subsoil; it has salt-excreting glands to rid itself of the excess salts that would otherwise accumulate.

Ecology
At the Moghra oasis, in the Qattara Depression, there is a brackish lake and a Phragmites swamp, and T. nilotica dominates a zone on the edge of the oasis where the vegetation ceases and the surrounding arid plains start. Here it grows in association with Alhagi maurorum, Nitraria retusa Zygophyllum album and Cressa cretica.

Uses
Tamarix nilotica can help stabilise sand and may form nabkhas as part of the dune forming process. Wind blown sand comes to rest at the foot of the shrub and accumulates, gradually creating a hummock; the shrub's extensive root system continues to extract moisture from the underlying saline substrate and grows at a faster rate than the mound rises.

In Egypt, T. nilotica has been used in traditional medicine as an antiseptic, an antipyretic, for alleviating headaches and reducing inflammation. It also has a reputation as an aphrodisiac.

References

nilotica
Flora of North Africa